Sarah Stewart Johnson is an American biologist, geochemist, astronomer and planetary scientist. She joined Georgetown in 2014 and is currently the Provost's Distinguished Associate Professor of Biology and the Science, Technology, and International Affairs program in the School of Foreign Service.

Early life and education
Johnson was born in Kentucky and grew up in Lexington. She received her bachelor's degree in 2001 from Washington University in St. Louis, where she was an Arthur Holly Compton Fellow and majored in math and environmental studies. During college, she won a Goldwater Scholarship and a Truman Scholarship. Johnson then attended Oxford as a Rhodes Scholar where she earned bachelor's and master's degrees. In 2008, she completed a PhD in planetary science at MIT.

Career
Johnson was a Junior Fellow at Harvard University from 2008-2009 and 2011-2013. She was a White House Fellow working for the President’s Science Advisor, under the Obama administration from 2009-2011. Johnson became a faculty member at Georgetown in 2014. Her work involves the use of analog environments to study the habitability of the surface and subsurface of Mars and icy moons. Her lab at Georgetown is currently focused on the detection of agnostic biosignatures, sometimes referred to as "life as we don't know it". She is a visiting scientist at NASA's Goddard Space Flight Center with the Planetary Environments lab. She participated in the Curiosity, Opportunity, and Spirit missions.

Bibliography
 The Sirens of Mars

Honors 
 Desert Writers Award (2013)
 White House Fellow (2009)
 Harvard Junior Fellow (2008)
 Hugh Hampton Young Fellowship, MIT (2008)
 National Science Foundation Graduate Research Fellowship
 Rhodes Scholarship (2001)
 Truman Scholarship (2000)
 Goldwater Scholarship (1999)
 Arthur Holly Compton Fellowship, Washington University in St. Louis (1997)

References

Living people
People from Lexington, Kentucky
American Rhodes Scholars
Georgetown University faculty
White House Fellows
Women planetary scientists
Planetary scientists
Year of birth missing (living people)
Washington University in St. Louis alumni
20th-century American women scientists
21st-century American women scientists